Pierre Dervaux (born 3 January 1917 in Juvisy-sur-Orge, France; died 20 February 1992 in Marseilles, France) was a French operatic conductor, composer, and pedagogue.  At the Conservatoire de Paris, he studied counterpoint and harmony with Marcel Samuel-Rousseau and Jean and Noël Gallon, as well as piano with Isidor Philipp, Armand Ferté, and Yves Nat. He also served as principal conductor of the Opéra-Comique (1947–53), and the Opéra de Paris (1956–72). In this capacity he directed the French première of Poulenc’s Dialogues des Carmélites. He was also Vice-President of the Concerts Pasdeloup (1949–55), President and Chief conductor of the Concerts Colonne (1958–92), Musical Director of the Orchestre des Pays de Loire (1971–79) as well as holding similar posts at the Quebec Symphony Orchestra (1968–75), where he collaborated with concertmaster Hidetaro Suzuki, and the Nice Philharmonic (1979–82).

He taught at the École Normale de Musique de Paris (1964–86), the Conservatoire de musique du Québec à Montréal (1965–72) and was also president of the jury of the international conducting competition in Besançon.

Dervaux composed two symphonies, two concertos, a string quartet, a trio and several songs.

In addition to the Légion d'honneur, Dervaux also received the Ordre national du Mérite.

His recordings include: L'Enfance du Christ (Berlioz) in 1959, Les pêcheurs de perles (Bizet) in 1961, and Istar, Wallenstein and La Forêt enchantée (d'Indy) in 1975.

Selected recordings

Camille Saint-Saëns, Complete Violin Concertos (n°1, n°2, n°3), Ulf Hoelscher, violin, New Philarmonie Orchestra, conductor Pierre Dervaux. Recorded 1977. 2 CD Brillant Classics 2012

External links
 http://www.answers.com/topic/pierre-dervaux-classical-musician?cat=entertainment

1917 births
1992 deaths
People from Juvisy-sur-Orge
French male conductors (music)
Officiers of the Légion d'honneur
Conservatoire de Paris alumni
Academic staff of the École Normale de Musique de Paris
Academic staff of the Conservatoire de musique du Québec à Montréal
Knights of the Ordre national du Mérite
Officiers of the Ordre des Arts et des Lettres
Burials at Père Lachaise Cemetery
Pupils of Isidor Philipp
20th-century French conductors (music)
20th-century French male musicians